An  is a sacred bow (yumi) used in certain Shinto rituals in Japan, as well as a Japanese musical bow, made from the wood of the Japanese  or Japanese cherry birch tree (Betula grossa). Playing an azusa yumi forms part of some Shinto rituals; in Japan, it is believed that merely the twanging of the bowstring will frighten ghosts and evil spirits away from a house. In Japanese poetry, the word azusa yumi functions as a makurakotoba ("pillow word", a kind of epithet).

The story is told in Japanese mythology that a golden bird perched on the bow of Emperor Jimmu, the great-grandson of the sun goddess Amaterasu, and the first human ruler of Japan. This was seen as an extremely good omen; Jimmu's bow developed the power to dispel evil by the mere plucking of its string. His bow was made of azusa wood, specifically the Betula grossa or Japanese cherry birch.

See also
 Apotropaic magic
 Amulet
 Talisman
 Omamori (御守 or お守り)
 Ofuda (御札/お札) -- a paper charm, similar to a Taoist/Daoist Fulu.  
 Hama Ya (破魔矢) -- an "Evil-Destroying Arrow".  
 Hama Yumi (破魔弓) -- an "Evil-Destroying Bow".  
 Saigū Yumi (祭宮弓) -- a "Ceremonial Bow".  
 Kabura-ya (鏑矢) -- a "Turnip[-headed] Arrow".

References

Bows (archery)
Musical bows
Weapons in Buddhist mythology
Ritual weapons
Honorary weapons
Buddhist symbols
Shinto in Japan
Shinto religious objects
Buddhist ritual implements
Amulets
Talismans
Exorcism in Shinto
Exorcism in Buddhism